The 2002 Vuelta a Murcia was the 18th professional edition of the Vuelta a Murcia cycle race and was held on 6 March to 10 March 2002. The race started and finished in Murcia. The race was won by Víctor Hugo Peña.

General classification

References

2002
2002 in road cycling
2002 in Spanish sport